Hakea tuberculata is a flowering plant in the family Proteaceae and is  endemic to several isolated areas along the coast in the Peel, South West, Great Southern and Goldfields-Esperance regions of Western Australia. It is an upright shrub with white flowers and rigid, prickly leaves.

Description
The branchlets are thickly covered in coarse,  stiff, rusty or white hairs. The overlapping bracts are covered with long, soft, white hairs. Flowering occurs mostly from March to April.

Taxonomy and naming
Hakea tuberculata  was first formally described  in 1830 by Robert Brown and the description was published in  Supplementum primum prodromi florae Novae Hollandiae. The specific epithet  (tuberculum) means a "small swelling", referring to the tubercles on the surface of the fruit.

Distribution and habitat
This hakea grows from the south coast at Augusta- Margaret River and Albany.  It is found growing in low-lying areas along creek and drainage lines in sand, loam and lateritic gravel. Mostly found in wet winter locations near ironstone.

Conservation status
Hakea tuberculata is classified as "not threatened" by the Western Australian Government Department of Parks and Wildlife.

References

tuberculata
Eudicots of Western Australia
Endemic flora of Western Australia
Taxa named by Robert Brown (botanist, born 1773)